The 2015 Memphis Tigers football team represented the University of Memphis in the 2015 NCAA Division I FBS football season. The Tigers were led by fourth-year head coach Justin Fuente and played their home games at the Liberty Bowl Memorial Stadium in Memphis, Tennessee. The Tigers competed as a member of the West Division of the American Athletic Conference. They finished the season 9–4, 5–3 in American Athletic play to finish in third place in the West Division. They were invited to the Birmingham Bowl where they lost to Auburn.

On October 17, the Tigers defeated Ole Miss which led them to a #18 ranking in polls after the Tigers began the season with an 8–0 record. Before they were defeated by Navy three weeks later, the Tigers were ranked as high as #13 in the polls, which was the highest ever ranking for the program in school history.

On November 29, head coach Justin Fuente resigned to become the head coach at Virginia Tech. He finished at Memphis with a four year record of 26–23. The Tigers were led by interim head coach Darrell Dickey in the Birmingham Bowl.

Schedule

Rankings

Game summaries

Missouri State

at Kansas

Bowling Green

Cincinnati

at South Florida

Ole Miss

at Tulsa

Tulane

Navy

at Houston

at Temple

SMU

vs. Auburn–Birmingham Bowl

References

Memphis
Memphis Tigers football seasons
Memphis Tigers football